The 2023 Copa Oster was a professional tennis tournament played on outdoor clay courts. It was the eighth edition of the tournament and second as a WTA 125 tournament which is part of the 2023 WTA 125 tournaments. It took place at the Club Campestre in Cali, Colombia between 30 January and 5 February 2023. The event made a return to Cali after an absence of 10 years.

Champions

Singles 

  Nadia Podoroska def.  Paula Ormaechea, 6–4, 6–2

Doubles 

  Weronika Falkowska /  Katarzyna Kawa def.  Kyōka Okamura /  You Xiaodi, 6–1, 5–7, [10–6]

Singles main draw entrants

Seeds 

 1 Rankings as of 16 January 2023

Other entrants 
The following players received wildcards into the singles main draw:
  Emiliana Arango
  María Herazo González
  Yuliana Lizarazo
  María Paulina Pérez

The following players received entry from the qualifying draw:
  Carolina Alves
  Martina Colmegna
  Quinn Gleason
  Marine Partaud

Withdrawals 
  Katharina Hobgarski → replaced by  Gabriela Cé
  Séléna Janicijevic → replaced by  Nuria Brancaccio
  Francesca Jones → replaced by  Julia Riera
  Magali Kempen → replaced by  Jamie Loeb
  Gabriela Lee → replaced by  Whitney Osuigwe
  Elizabeth Mandlik → replaced by  Weronika Falkowska
  Arantxa Rus → replaced by  Valeriya Strakhova

Doubles main draw entrants

Seeds 

 1 Rankings as of 16 January 2023

Other entrants 
The following teams received wildcards into the doubles main draw:
  Yuliana Lizarazo /  María Paulina Pérez

Withdrawals
  Aliona Bolsova /  Caroline Dolehide → replaced by  Renata Zarazúa /  Emiliana Arango

References

External links 
  

2023 WTA 125 tournaments
2023 in Colombian sport
2023
January 2023 sports events in South America
February 2023 sports events in South America